Deena Larsen (born 1964) is a new media and hypertext fiction author involved in the creative electronic writing community since the 1980s. Her work has been published in online journals such as the Iowa Review Web, Cauldron and Net, frAme, inFLECT, and Blue Moon Review. Since May 2007, the Deena Larsen Collection of early electronic literature has been housed at the Maryland Institute for Technology in the Humanities.

Education
In 1986, Larsen received her BA in English and Logic from the University of Northern Colorado. Her undergraduate thesis, Nansense Ya Snorsted: A logical look at nonsense, received the university's 1986 Best Thesis Award. In 1991, after spending time in San Francisco and Japan, she returned to Colorado and earned her MA in English from the University of Colorado where she wrote one of the first MA thesis on hypertext titled Hypertext and Hyperpossibilities.

Career and influence 
Larsen has been noted by the Electronic Literature Organization as "a pioneering influence in the electronic literature field." She is described as a "new media visionary who has been active in the creative electronic writing community since its inception in the 1980s" by the Maryland Institute of Technology in the Humanities, which hosts a collection of her papers and software. Larsen's experimentation with literary possibilities in new digital media has led to her work being frequently analysed and cited by scholars and critics, with works like "Carving in Possibilities" (2001) being called "canonical".  

Larsen has led numerous writers workshops—either online, at conferences, or universities— on the subject of hypertext, and has played a vital role in organising the electronic literature community. She hosted Hypertext Writers' Workshops at ACM Hypertext conferences in the 1990s and hosted the Electronic Literature Organization online chats on electronic literature from 2000 to 2005. In 2012, Larsen wrote a free textbook called Fun da mentals which serves as an introduction to the field of electronic literature. She currently works as a technical writer at the Bureau of Reclamation, where she was an investigator for research granted by the Science and Technology Program in the 2015 fiscal year. 

As of 2022, Larsen serves on the Literary Advisory Board for the Electronic Literature Organization. She has also been a board member for trAce and is a past member of the board of directors for the ELO.

Works
Deena Larsen's first work, Marble Springs (1993), Eastgate Systems Inc., was one of the first interactive hypertext poetry collections. The work explores the lives of women in a Colorado mountain town in the 19th century. Larsen's admiration for Edgar Lee Master's Spoon River Anthology inspired her to create her own world that followed connections similar to those experienced by readers of Master's book experienced. Written in Hypercard, Marble Springs includes a collection of poems for the reader to explore and discover the identity of the author behind each poem. Writing in Poetics Today, narratologist Marie-Laure Ryan describes Marble Springs as a "narrative of place", which is not constructed around an overarching plot or "grand narrative", but "in the 'little stories' that the user discovers in all the nooks and crannies of the fictional world." This means that closure is built in, enabling "readers to pause in their reading or leave it completely".

Her second work, Samplers, Eastgate Systems (1997), is a series of short stories done in Storyspace and used the design of a quilt pattern to tell various stories. Samplers explores allows the reader to explore different narratives and stories through hypertext. Eastgate Systems Inc. noted Larsen's work as "Finely written and intricately structured, Samplers breaks new ground for short hypertext fiction."

Regarding Larsen's work, scholar Jessica Laccetti observed that, "In Larsen’s case, as in Caitlin Fisher’s These Waves of Girls, a default path is built into the narrative, suggesting both chronological sequence and plot development. While 'scholars and analysts' can travel more flexible paths through the stories, first time-readers are advised to follow thematic or character links."

Selected works

References

Further reading
Bolter, Jay David. Writing space: computers, hypertext, and the remediation of print. New York: Routledge, 2001. .
Funkhouser, Chris. Prehistoric digital poetry: an archaeology of forms, 1959-1995. Tuscaloosa: University of Alabama Press, 2007. .
Müller-Zettelmann, Eva and Margarete Rubik, eds. Theory into poetry: new approaches to the lyric. Kenilworth, NY: Rodopi, 2005. .
Smith, Hazel. The writing experiment: strategies for innovative creative writing.  Crows Nest: Allen & Unwin, 2005. .

External links

 Larsen's home page
 Eastgate Systems author
 Larsen's collection of early hypertext works and her own drafts at Maryland Institute of Technologies in the Humanities
 The Rose Project
 Marble Springs 3.0

1964 births
Living people
Writers from Colorado
Interactive fiction writers
Electronic literature writers
American women poets
20th-century American poets
20th-century American women writers
21st-century American poets
21st-century American women writers
American women short story writers
20th-century American short story writers
21st-century American short story writers